Aslantaş Dam is an embankment dam on Ceyhan River in Osmaniye Province, southern Turkey, built between 1975 and 1984.

It also supports a 138 MW power station, which generates 569 GWh electricity annually. According to some sources, the construction of the Aslantaş Dam resulted in involuntary resettlement of 60,000 people.

Partly on the western and eastern banks of the dam reservoir, the Karatepe-Aslantaş National Park is located. On a peninsula at the west bank, the hill Karatepe is situated inside the national park. Overlooking the dam reservoir, a walled settlement of the Neo-Hittites was discovered on Karatepe dating back to the 8th century BC. Following archaeological excavations between 1946 and 1952, the site was preserved as the Karatepe-Aslantaş Open-Air Museum in 1958.

See also

List of dams and reservoirs in Turkey

References

External links
General Directorate of State Hydraulic Works (DSI)

Dams in Osmaniye Province
Hydroelectric power stations in Turkey
Dams completed in 1984
Dams on the Ceyhan River